Black Sky (Spanish: Cielo negro) is a 1951 Spanish drama film directed by Manuel Mur Oti and starring Susana Canales, Fernando Rey and Luis Prendes. A woman working in a shop falls in love with a bohemian poet.

Cast
 Susana Canales as Emilia  
 Fernando Rey as Ángel López Veiga  
 Luis Prendes as Ricardo Fortun  
 Teresa Casal 
 Inés Pérez Indarte 
 Julia Caba Alba as Fermina  
 Porfiria Sanchíz 
 Mónica Pastrana 
 Francisco Pierrá 
 Rafael Bardem 
 Manuel Arbó 
 Ramón Martori
 Raúl Cancio 
 Casimiro Hurtado as Pepe - camarero  
 José Isbert 
 Manolo Morán 
 Nicolás D. Perchicot 
 Antonio Riquelme as Churrero en la verbena  
 Vicente Soler

References

Bibliography 
 Mira, Alberto. Historical Dictionary of Spanish Cinema. Scarecrow Press, 2010.

External links 
 

1951 films
1951 drama films
Spanish drama films
1950s Spanish-language films
Films directed by Manuel Mur Oti
Spanish black-and-white films
1950s Spanish films